The 1978–79 season was the 64th season in Hajduk Split's history and their 33rd season in the Yugoslav First League. Their 3rd-place finish in the 1977–78 season meant it was their 33rd successive season playing in the Yugoslav First League.

Competitions

Overall

Yugoslav First League

Classification

Results summary

Results by round

Matches

First League 

Source: hajduk.hr

Yugoslav Cup 

Sources: hajduk.hr

UEFA Cup 

Source: hajduk.hr

Player seasonal records

Top scorers 

Source: Competitive matches

See also 
 1978–79 Yugoslav First League
 1978–79 Yugoslav Cup

References

External sources 
 1978–79 Yugoslav First League at rsssf.com
 1978–79 Yugoslav Cup at rsssf.com
 1978–79 UEFA Cup at rsssf.com

HNK Hajduk Split seasons
Hajduk Split
Yugoslav football championship-winning seasons